The Grêmio Recreativo Escola de Samba Caprichosos de Pilares (or simply Caprichosos de Pilares) is a Brazilian samba school of Rio de Janeiro based in the neighborhood of Pilares.

It was founded on February 19, 1949 by Oscar Lino, Dagoberto Bernardo, Valter Machado, Romão da Silva, Gilberto Ribeiro, Amarildo Cristiano, João Cândido, Sebastian Benjamin, Tia Alvarinda and Athayde Pereira although many historians the point as sort of dissent from another former association in Pilares: Unidos da Terra Nova.

However this school was on the outskirts of the currently defunct Terra Nova in what now today and part of Pilares. A sambists group decided create a new entity. Its original colors were red and white, but then were changed to blue and white in honor of godmother Portela.

Its symbol is a shield containing a tambourine and a box-of-war enveloped by two blue snakes with their tails wrapped around each other, which has the initials of the association beneath them, and there are two versions for the choice. many names of samba and rhythm started at school, such Anderson Leonardo, Xande de Pilares, Sandra de Sá and battery director Paulinho Botelho.

But what made history even at school was the plots in satire, criticism and humor created by Luiz Fernando Reis where they constitute a formula that spoke Inflation have criticized politicians asked Diretas Já that please and spoke to the public. However the revisionist school, and this style, culminating in various descents, to access groups.

In 2015 the school presented the plot "in my hand is cheaper, the carnival rookie Leandro Vieira, wiring closets us and who coordinated the shed showed a bit of irreverent plotlines and did your best presentation of the Decade according to critics about the parade in seventh place.

However already without the carnival producer Amauri Santos which a parade before carnival already expected due to internal problems and financial which many members paraded with incomplete costumes and floats badly finished. culminated in relegation and consequently on Intendente Magalhães.

Classifications

References 

Samba schools of Rio de Janeiro